The SAB AB-80 was a French bomber built in 1934 by the Société Aérienne Bordelaise (SAB) in Bordeaux.

Design
The SAB AB-80 was a high-wing monoplane bomber development that was intended to eventually also carry troops. It was built wholly of metal and was powered by two  Hispano-Suiza 12Ybrs engines.

The aircraft had roofed fighting platforms and the sides were protected by armour plate and bulletproof glass. The gunner's cockpit in the nose had many windows, giving full visibility. It had a non-retractable tailwheel undercarriage.

Development
The first flight of the AB-80 took place on 23 June 1934. Only one unit was built.

Specifications

See also

References

External links

Airwar - AB-80
RCgroups - SAB AB-80 picture

Société Aérienne Bordelaise
1930s French bomber aircraft
High-wing aircraft
Aircraft first flown in 1934
Twin piston-engined tractor aircraft